Donald Ofik, popularly known as Prettyboy D-O, is a Nigerian recording artist with chaotic blend of Afrobeats, hip hop, alté, dancehall, and R&B. His debut mixtape Everything Pretty reached the number one spot on iTunes. He was nominated for The Headies 2022 Best Reggae and Dancehall Album.

Music career
In July 2022, Aluna, Prettyboy D-O and KoolDrink teamed up to release the amapiano-Afrobeat single "Nowhere to Hide". In 2021, Prettyboy released his album, Love is War, and it appeared on The Fader's list of top 50 best albums 2021. His style has been described as "culte" (a combination of cult and alté) referring to his large following and mixture of street music and alté genres.

Discography

Mixtape
Everything Pretty

Album
Love is War

Awards and nominations

References

External links
 Official website

Nigerian musicians

Year of birth missing (living people)
Living people